Sarde is an Indian village in the Tehsil of Uran of the Raigad District of the Indian state of Maharashtra.

Demographics
As of the 2011 census, Sarde has a total population of 1389. 51% of the population is male, and 10% are aged 0–6. Of the 338 households, 98% belong to the Agri Community where they speak Agri dialect. 2% are from Scheduled Tribes and none from Scheduled Castes.

The literacy rate is 73% (67% for females, 79% for males). 45% had a steady job of six or more months at the time of the census (main workers), and 3% a less steady job (marginal workers): of the main workers, 42% were cultivators, 12% agricultural laborers, 2% household industry workers, and 45% other workers.

References

Villages in Raigad district